Justice of the Far North is a 1925 American silent adventure film directed by Norman Dawn and starring Arthur Jasmine, Marcia Manon and Laska Winter.

Cast
Arthur Jasmine as Umluk 
Marcia Manon as Wamba 
Laska Winter as Nootka 
Charles Reisner as Mike Burke 
Max Davidson as Izzy Hawkins 
George Fisher as Dr. Wells 
Katherine Dawn as Lucy Parsons 
Steve Murphy as Broken Nose McGee

References

External links

1925 adventure films
American adventure films
Films directed by Norman Dawn
American silent feature films
American black-and-white films
Columbia Pictures films
1920s English-language films
1920s American films
Silent adventure films